Kengo (written: , , , , , , , , ,  or ) is a masculine Japanese given name. Notable people with the name include:

, Japanese manga artist
, Japanese footballer
, Japanese footballer
, Japanese professional wrestler
, Japanese footballer
, Japanese actor
, Japanese architect
, Japanese professional wrestler
, Japanese footballer
, Japanese basketball player
, Japanese actor
, Japanese kickboxer
, Japanese footballer
, Japanese sprinter

Fictional characters
, a character in the visual novel Little Busters!
, a character in the manga series Monochrome Factor

Japanese masculine given names